Gangubai Kathiawadi is a 2022 Indian Hindi-language biographical crime drama film directed by Sanjay Leela Bhansali and produced by Bhansali and Jayantilal Gada. The film stars Alia Bhatt as the titular character with Ajay Devgn, Shantanu Maheshwari, Vijay Raaz, Indira Tiwari, Seema Pahwa and Varun Kapoor in pivotal roles.

The film is loosely based on the true story of Ganga Jagjivandas Kathiawadi, popularly known as Gangubai Kothewali, whose life was documented in the book Mafia Queens of Mumbai written by S. Hussain Zaidi. The film depicts the rise of a simple girl from Kathiawad who had no choice but to embrace the ways of destiny and swing it in her favour. Gangubai Kathiawadi premiered at the 72nd Berlin International Film Festival on 16 February 2022, and was released in theatres on 25 February 2022.

Gangubai Kathiawadi received critical acclaim for its themes, direction, production value and Bhatt's performance. In its theatrical run the film grossed 153.69 core at the domestic box office and 209.77 globally emerging as a commercial success. Numerous publications listed Gangubai Kathiawadi and Bhatt's performance in the film on various year-end best films and performances lists of 2022.

Plot 
A young girl named Madhu is forced into prostitution against her will. She refuses to become a prostitute, so she is tortured by brothel madame Rashmibai. Later, Gangubai is asked to persuade Madhu. She meets Madhu and tells her own story to her.

Born into an affluent family in Kathiawad, Ganga Jagjivandas Kathiawadi, a daughter of a barrister, aspired to become a Bollywood actress. At the age of 16, she eloped with her boyfriend Ramnik Lal to Mumbai as he promised Ganga a film career under the tutelage of his aunt Sheela. Her whole life turned upside down as he sold her to a brothel owned by Sheela Masi in Kamathipura for Rs 1000, where she forcefully had to become a prostitute. She later changes her name to Gangu. While there, she befriends a woman named Kamli. A man named Shaukat Abbas Khan visits the brothel and attacks Gangu. She goes to mafia leader Rahim Lala for justice, and he becomes her sworn brother after he hears her plea. Gangu becomes the madame of her brothel after Sheela Masi dies, renames herself Gangubai, and goes on to become a powerful political figure.

After listening to Madhu, she frees her from the brothel and sends her home safely. Gangubai later falls in love with a young tailor, Afsaan Razzaq who also reciprocates her feelings. However, she arranges his marriage to Roshni, the daughter of a fellow prostitute named Kusum to save Roshni from being a prostitute, as she can't marry Afsaan herself due to being a sex worker.

She runs in the Kamathipura presidential elections against Raziabai and wins after showing movies during Razia's speech to draw people away. In this new role, she advocates for women's rights. While in office, Gangubai calls her family for the first time in 12 years and finds out that her father has died and her mother has not forgiven her for running away.

Later, she finds out that a ward secretary intends for everyone in Kamathipura to be vacated during a meeting with Rahim Lala. The secretary wishes to build skyscrapers in the neighbourhood with the support of a school which accuses Kamathipura of being a site of immorality. Rahim Lala rejects the secretary's deal and warns Gangubai to prepare herself to be sued and brought to court.

Gangubai walks into a meeting with a journalist and school principal with the children of the brothel. There, she offers five years' fees for all 8 girls and states that children from a brothel deserve an education. The girls are enrolled in front of the journalist, Mr. Faizi. However, the children are hit and thrown out of the school on their first day. At the same time, Kamli falls ill after giving birth and dies. Gangubai takes in Kamli's child, Pammi. Mr. Faizi prepares a speech on education for prostitutes for Gangubai to read at a rally, but she does not follow the script. Instead, she asks the audience why prostitutes are the target of discrimination when they do not discriminate when providing services. She also says that she will fight for prostitutes' children to receive an education and for prostitutes to be given respect in society. After her speech goes viral, Gangubai receives Mr. Faizi and a local politician in her brothel. The politician asks for her votes and informs her that the school which wants her brothel vacated has submitted a petition to the Supreme Court.

Gangubai prepares a trip to New Delhi to meet with the Prime Minister, Jawaharlal Nehru. Gangubai asks the Prime Minister to legalize prostitution, but he refuses. After discussion, the Prime Minister eventually agrees to set up a committee on the matter. He also agrees to block the brothel and Kamathipura from being vacated. While prostitution was not legalized, Kamathipura celebrates its continued existence, thanks to Gangubai Kathiawadi.

Cast

Production

Development 
The news about an adaptation of one of the chapters of Hussain Zaidi's book Mafia Queens of Mumbai first came out in June 2017 with Priyanka Chopra attached to star as the leading character. The film's earlier title was Heera Mandi. In March 2019, Chopra confirmed that she was working on a project with Bhansali, who also confirmed that he was making Gangubai Kathiawadi with Chopra. However, in September 2019, media reported that Alia Bhatt, who was supposed to do a different film, titled Inshallah, by Bhansali was going to replace Chopra after Inshallah got shelved. Principal photography begun in Film City,Mumbai on 27 December 2019.

Casting 
The film marks the Bollywood debut of television personality Shantanu Maheshwari, who portrays Gangubai's boyfriend Afsaan. and TV actor Varun Kapoor to debut as the grey role of Ramnik Lala.

Filming 
Production was put on hold in March 2020 due to the lockdown ordered by the Indian government owing to the COVID-19 pandemic, when the film was 70% complete. Bhatt resumed work on 6 October 2020, and Ajay Devgn who is playing a cameo joined sets on 27 February 2021. The film was wrapped up on 26 June 2021.

Soundtrack 

The film score is composed by brothers Sanchit Balhara and Ankit Balhara, while the songs featured in the film are composed by Sanjay Leela Bhansali with lyrics  written by A. M. Turaz, Kumaar and Bhojak Ashok "Anjam". The Hindi version of the chours singer includes Tarannum Jain, Dipti Rege, Aditi Pradhudesai, Aditi Paul, Kalpana, Ruchna, Pragti.

The Telugu version of the chours singer includes Sahithi Komanduri, P. Sathya Yamini, Harini Ivaturi, Aswhini Chepuri, V. Pavani.

Release

Theatrical 
Gangubai Kathiawadi had its premiere on 16 February 2022 at 72nd Berlin International Film Festival, at the Berlinale Speciale Gala Section. The film was released in cinemas on 25 February 2022. Earlier, the film was scheduled for release on 30 July 2021 but it was postponed due to the rising cases and second wave of the COVID-19 pandemic. It was then scheduled for worldwide release in theatres on 6 January 2022 but to avoid clash with S. S. Rajamouli's RRR, the release has been changed to 18 February. Later, the date was pushed back by a week to release on 25 February 2022.

The film was released in Hindi along with the Telugu-language dubbed version.

Home media 
The film is now streaming on Netflix from 26 April 2022. In June 2022, the film became the most-watched Indian film on Netflix.

Reception

Critical response
Gangubai Kathiawadi received critical acclaim with praise directed towards the performances (particularly Bhatt, Raaz, Maheshwari, Devgn and Pahwa), music, production design, cinematography, storyline and Bhansali's direction. On the review aggregator website Rotten Tomatoes, the film holds an approval rating of 90% based on 20 reviews and an average rating of 7/10.

Sushri Sahu of Mashable gave the film a rating of 4.5/5 and wrote "Sanjay Leela Bhansali's 'Gangubai Kathiawadi' starring Alia Bhatt, Ajay Devgn and others is an absolute crowd-puller. Mugdha Kapoor Safaya of DNA India gave the film a rating of 4/5 and wrote "The film's narrative is such that you will empathise with Gangu, root for her and cheer for her with every small victory, but never pity her." Jagadish Angadi of Deccan Herald gave the film a rating of 4/5 and wrote "Alia Bhat as Gangubai is exceptionally brilliant.The linear storytelling effectively highlights multiple conflicts of Gangubai. Wendy Ide of The Guardian gave the film a rating of 4/5 and wrote "The hard-hitting story of a sex worker who rises through the ranks of 60s gangland Mumbai is powered by a magnetic performance from Alia Bhatt".

Ronak Kotecha of The Times of India gave a rating of 3.5/5 and wrote "With whatever is packed into this drama, there are enough moments that will draw you into this world where nights seem endless and the lights never fade." Saibal Chatterjee of NDTV gave the film a rating of 3.5/5 and wrote "The visually sumptuous character study, more baroque than 1950s Bombay, is at once sweeping and intimate". Tushar Joshi of India Today gave a rating of 3.5/5 and wrote "Gangubai Kathiawadi's camera work, background score and dialogues are the three pillars that take it from being just another gutsy biopic to a film that creates a massive impact. Gangubai is a solid risk for both Bhansali and Alia. A risk that pays off beautifully for both the director and his muse". Prathap Nair of Firstpost gave a rating of 3.5/5 and wrote "Written by Bhansali and Utkarshini Vashishtha, it flips the narrative by handing out extraordinary concessions to the female lead at its heart, not entirely a frequent occurrence in Bollywood". Bollywood Hungama gave the film a rating of 3.5/5 and wrote "Alia Bhatt starrer Gangubai Kathiawadi is a powerful saga and is embellished with terrific moments and a career best performance by Alia Bhatt. At the box office, it has bright chances to score with the multiplex and female audiences". Stutee Ghosh of The Quint gave the film a rating of 3.5/5 and wrote "Gangubai Kathiawadi is a Sanjay Leela Bhansali canvas and a complete Alia Bhatt show".

Sukanya Verma of Rediff gave the film a rating of 3.5/5 and wrote "Something in Alia has surely changed after Gangubai.Her entire performance is about proving to herself and not to the world what she can do, feels Sukanya Verma". Sanjana Jadhav of Pinkvilla gave the film a rating of 3.5/5 and wrote "Alia Bhatt and the cast performance, Bhansali's visuals and a sneak peek into this brutal world makes it a definite watch". Devesh Sharma of Filmfare gave the film a rating of 3.5/5 and wrote " SLB has again given us a film which keeps us glued to our seats for close to three hours". Shubhra Gupta of The Indian Express gave the film a rating of 3/5 and wrote "Sanjay Leela Bhansali's latest is the kind of old-fashioned dialogue-heavy, sentiment-on-sleeve film which Bollywood is forgetting how to make". Monika Rawal Kukreja of Hindustan Times wrote "Alia Bhatt...has given a superlative performance as Gangubai". Anuj Kumar of The Hindu wrote "This is easily Bhansali at his best as he has been able to marry craft with content; here, he attempts a  Pakeezah for the millennials and almost succeeds". Sonia Dedhia of News18 wrote "Alia Bhatt practically disappears into the character of Gangubai Kathiawadi. There's a hard-to-miss intensity in her eyes, and tenacity in her voice".

Year-end lists 
Mike McCahill of The Guardian crowned Bhatt's performance in Gangubai Kathiawadi  as "one of 2022's greatest performance." Wendy Ide of Screen Daily named Bhatt's performance in the film as the best performance of the year 2022. Mark Kermode of The Guardian listed Bhatt's performance in the film as one of the ten best performances of 2022. Subhash K. Jha of Times of India listed Bhatt's performance in the film among the top five acclaimed female performances of 2022. Sukanya Verma of Rediff listed Bhatt as one of the top female performers of 2022. Sanyukta Thakare of Mashable listed Bhatt as one of the top female performers of the year. Santanu Das of Hindustan Times listed Bhatt's performance in the film as one of the best Indian film performances of 2022. Sakshi of News 24 listed Bhatt's performance in the film as one of the best Indian film performances of 2022. Ananya Jain of Indiatimes listed Bhatt's performance in the film as one of the best Indian film performances of 2022. Man's World staff listed Bhatt's performance in the film as one of the best Bollywood female performances of 2022. Subhash K. Jha of Firstpost crowned Gangubai Kathiawadi as the best Hindi film of 2022. Anupama Chopra of Film Companion ranked it as the third best Indian film of 2022. Shubhra Gupta of The Indian Express listed it as one of the best films of 2022. Deepa Gahlot of Rediff listed it as one of her top movies of 2022. Aparita Bhandari of Paste listed it as one of the ten best Bollywood movies of 2022. Times of India listed it as one of the best Bollywood films of 2022. The Financial Express listed it as one of the highly acclaimed content-driven films of 2022. Corinne Sullivan and Jasmine Ting of Cosmopolitan listed it as one of the twenty best Bollywood movies of 2022. Allan Hunter of Screen Daily listed it as one of the ten best films of 2022. Siddhant Adlakha of Vulture listed it as one of the five best Indian films of 2022. Shomini Sen of WION listed it as one of the best Hindi films of 2022. Anuj Kumar of The Hindu listed it as one of the best Hindi films of 2022. Nidhi Gupta of Vogue India listed it as one of the best Bollywood movies of 2022. Scroll staff listed it as one of 2022’s best and most memorable releases in cinemas and on streaming platforms across different languages. Meenakshi Shedde of Mid-Day listed it as one of the top twenty best All-India films of 2022.

Box office 
Gangubai Kathiawadi earned 10.50 crore at the domestic box office on its opening day. On the second day, the film collected 13.32 crore. On the third day, the film collected 15.30 crore, taking total domestic weekend collection to 39.12 crore.

, the film grossed  crore in India and  crore overseas, for a worldwide gross collection of  crore, recovering its budget and emerging as a commercial success. The film grossed over  worldwide, becoming the fifth highest grossing Hindi films of 2022. Bollywood Hungama and Box Office India stated that the film's box-office verdict as "hit."

Impact 
Gangubai Kathiawadi is credited as one of the films which has revived the movie business post Covid-19 Pandemic. It is considered as an ice-breaker for Bollywood since it was the first Hindi film to pull audiences back to the cinema halls after the pandemic. Bollywood Hungama noted that Gangubai  Kathiawadi's commercial performance has given the much-needed hope to the industry that the box-office in the near future would fire up even more. They also noted Bhatt's ability to shoulder a film on her own and stated, ‘‘Actresses often are not able to do so and need the help of a male actor to get audiences to cinemas. Alia, on the other hand, stands out and she doesn't need any hero's support. Without a male actor, she has managed to deliver a film that's all set to enter the 100 crore club and that speaks volumes’’. Additionally, Bollywood Hungama further noted that, there's a belief that the cinema-going audience primarily consists of males. As a result, testosterone-driven films aimed at men would have a high chance of succeeding and fairer sex can't make a film a hit. However, Gangubai Kathiawadi's box office performance proves that even women audiences can take the film into the 'hit' or even the 'super-hit' zone. Bhatt's look in Gangubai Kathiawadi inspired Malaysia's Northern Haute Couture Fashion Show 2022. Deadline Hollywood noted that Gangubai Kathiawadi proved to be a ‘‘rare-breakout’’ for a female-led Bollywood feature.

Accolades

References

External links 
 
 
 
 Who is Gangubhai at BBC Tamil

2022 drama films
2022 films
2020s Hindi-language films
Indian biographical drama films
Indian gangster films
Films about prostitution in India
Films based on Indian novels
Cultural depictions of Jawaharlal Nehru
Cultural depictions of Indian women
Films about courtesans in India
Indian films based on actual events
Hindi-language films based on actual events
Films based on non-fiction books about organized crime
Films set in Mumbai
Films shot in Mumbai
Indian historical drama films
Films set in the 1960s
Films set in the 1950s